Pierre de Vizcaya Laurent (5 July 1894 – 16 July 1933) was a Spanish racecar driver.

Indy 500 results

Notes

External links

 Profile on Historic Racing

1894 births
1933 deaths
Spanish racing drivers
Indianapolis 500 drivers